Alanis is a 2017 Argentine drama film directed, co-written and co-produced by Anahí Berneri. It premiered in September 2017 at the Toronto International Film Festival as part of its Contemporary World Cinema programme. The film was also screened at the San Sebastián International Film Festival, where Berneri and Castiglione received the Silver Shell for Best Director and Best Actress respectively.

Cast
Sofía Gala Castiglione as Alanis
Dante Della Paolera as Dante
Dana Basso as Gisela
Silvina Sabater as Andrea
Carlos Vuletich as Román
Estela Garelli as Social worker
Santiago Pedrero as Santiago

Reception
Alanis received positive reviews from film critics. The review aggregator Rotten Tomatoes gives the film an approval rating of 100% based on 12 reviews, with an average rating of 7.67/10. On Todas Las Críticas, which assigns a normalized rating based on Argentine reviews, the film has a weighted average score of 76 out of 100, based on 35 critics.

References

External links
  on Cinenacional.com
 
 

2017 films
2017 drama films
2010s Spanish-language films
Argentine drama films
Films set in Buenos Aires
Films shot in Buenos Aires
Films about prostitution in Argentina
2010s Argentine films